The Cresco Opera House, also known as the Cresco Theater, is a historic building located in Cresco, Iowa, United States.  The first known theater in Cresco was the Lyric Hall, which opened in 1875.  It showed the first movies around 1900.  The Family and the Cozy theaters opened around the turn of the century.  The Lyric was condemned and torn down in 1913, and the other two were considered substandard.  The Cresco Commercial Club held a fundraiser in early 1914 to build an opera house. The Cresco Opera House Company was organized around the same time.  The building was completed by the end of the year, and it opened in 1915.  It was designed by local engineer Joseph H. Howe, and constructed by local builder Martin Johnson.  The musical High Jinks was the first performance held in the theater.  The theater, which seats 425, was equipped to show movies and there was a community hall in the basement.  It was listed on the National Register of Historic Places in 1981.

References

Theatres completed in 1914
Prairie School architecture in Iowa
Theatres on the National Register of Historic Places in Iowa
Cinemas and movie theaters in Iowa
Buildings and structures in Howard County, Iowa
National Register of Historic Places in Howard County, Iowa
Opera houses on the National Register of Historic Places in Iowa
Opera houses in Iowa